Gianfredo Camesi (born 24 March 1940) is a Swiss painter.

27 of his works are part of the collection of the Museo d'Arte della Svizzera Italiana in Lugano.

References

20th-century Swiss painters
Swiss male painters
Swiss contemporary artists
21st-century Swiss painters
21st-century Swiss male artists
1940 births
Living people
20th-century Swiss male artists